Joseph Edmund Crawford (December 2, 1877 – October 9, 1964) was an Ontario chartered accountant and political figure. He represented Fort William in the Legislative Assembly of Ontario from 1934 to 1937 as a Liberal member.

Early life 
He was born in Invermay, Bruce County, Ontario, the son of Robert Crawford. In 1909, he married Jessie C. Baker. After moving to Fort William, he lived for many years at 136 North Franklin Street in Fort William, nearby his sister Martha at 191 East Francis.

Political career 
He served on Fort William city council and was mayor from 1926 to 1928. Crawford was an unsuccessful candidate for a seat in the provincial assembly in 1929, but took 41% of the vote. He served on the Board of Education and was director of the local YMCA. He was president of the local Chamber of Commerce and vice-president of the Fort William Red Cross Society.

First elected in the Hepburn sweep of June 1934, he easily defeated Conservative Franklin Harford Spence 9190 votes to 5375, but when he opposed Hepburn's separate school legislation, he was challenged for the Liberal nomination by Roman Catholic Harry Murphy who ran in the October 1937 election as the official Liberal candidate. Crawford ran as an Independent Liberal, such that the Liberal vote split, permitting Frank Spence to retake the riding for the Conservatives.

References

 Canadian Parliamentary Guide, 1937, AL Normandin
 F. Brent Scollie, Thunder Bay Mayors & Councillors 1873-1945 (Thunder Bay Historical Museum Society, 2000), 170-171.

External links 

Fort William City Councils 1920-1929 Mayor Joseph Edmund Crawford 

1877 births
1964 deaths
Mayors of Fort William, Ontario
Ontario Liberal Party MPPs
Politicians from Thunder Bay